Vipoig (died c. AD 341) was a legendary Pictish king said to have ruled from around 311 to 341. He is only known from the Pictish Chronicle, a regnal list of Pictish monarchs. He is the first king mentioned in the chronicles, and was said to be succeeded by Canutulachama.

References

341 deaths
Pictish monarchs